Oltchim S.A., is one of the largest chemical companies in Romania and Southeastern Europe, with a total of 3470 employees in 2011. It was established in 1966 under the name Râmnicu Vâlcea Chemical Works. Constructions of the facilities began in July 1966. The first plant, Mercury Cells Electrolysis, was commissioned on 28 July 1968. In 1990, a government decision, turned the Râmnicu Vâlcea Chemical Works into a joint-stock company, called Oltchim S.A. The current company is exporting in more than 80 countries.

Since 1997, Oltchim is listed on the Bucharest Stock Exchange.

Products
 PVC
 propylene oxide
 propylene glycol and polyether polyols
 caustic soda
 other chlorosodics 
 construction materials

Notes

Chemical companies of Romania
Plastics companies of Romania
Râmnicu Vâlcea
Chemical companies established in 1966
1966 establishments in Romania
Companies listed on the Bucharest Stock Exchange
Romanian brands
Companies of Vâlcea County